H.C. Wilcox Technical High School, or Wilcox Tech, is a technical high school located in Meriden, Connecticut, that was first established in 1918. It receives students from many nearby towns. Wilcox Tech is part of the Connecticut Technical High School System. Like many Connecticut Technical High Schools, their decades-old building was recently renovated and expanded, at a cost of $77.5 million, and reopened in the fall of 2014.

Technologies 

In addition to a complete and rigorous academic program leading to a high school diploma, students attending Wilcox Tech receive training in one of the following 13 technologies:

 Automotive Collision Repair and Refinishing
 Automotive Technology
 Carpentry
 Culinary Arts
 Electrical
 Electronics
 Graphics Technology
 Hairdressing and Cosmetology
 Health Technology
 Heating, Ventilation, and Air Conditioning
 Information Systems Technology
 Precision Machining
 Plumbing and Heating

Notable alumni 

 Miguel Cardona, Class of 1993, educator and United States Secretary of Education

References

External links
 Official website

Schools in New Haven County, Connecticut
Public high schools in Connecticut
Buildings and structures in Meriden, Connecticut